Young for Eternity is the debut studio album by British rock band the Subways. The album was released on 4 July 2005 by City Pavement/Infectious Records. It reached number 32 in the UK charts and was certified gold in January 2007 for shipments of 100,000 units.

Track listing

Personnel
The Subways – Music on all Tracks
Billy Lunn – Guitar, Vocals, Lyrics on all Tracks
Charlotte Cooper – Bass, Vocals
Josh Morgan – Drums
Ian Broudie – Producer, Mixing
Jon Gray – Engineer, Mixing
Stuart Nicholls – Photography
Sarh Foley – Sleeve Design
Stage Three Music LTD. – Publishing

German Special Edition CD (released 2006)

This special edition – distributed through Warner Music Group Germany (Infectious Records | 2564 63722-2) – has a white artwork. Instead of the missing Hidden Track it features a special enhanced part:

Oh Yeah (Video)
Rock & Roll Queen (Video)
With You (Video)
No Goodbyes (Video)
The Subways: Live & Loud (Documentary; 25 minutes)

Album singles

Album chart positions

References

2005 debut albums
The Subways albums
Albums produced by Ian Broudie
Albums recorded at Elevator Studios